Grasshopper Club Zürich, commonly referred to as simply GC, GCZ, or Grasshoppers, is a multisports club based in Zürich, Switzerland. The oldest and best known department of the club is its football team. With 27 titles, Grasshopper holds the records for winning the most national championships and the Swiss Cups, 19 trophies in the latter. The club is the oldest football team in Zürich and maintains a substantial rivalry with FC Zürich.

The origin of Grasshopper's name is unknown, although the most common explanation refers to its early players' energetic post-goal celebrations and that their style of play was nimble and energetic.

After a number of appearances in European Cups and the UEFA Champions League, Grasshopper has become one of Switzerland's most recognizable football clubs. Today, in addition to its main football squad, the club has competitive professional and youth teams in rowing, ice hockey, handball, lawn tennis, court tennis, field hockey, curling, basketball, rugby, squash, floorball and beach soccer.

History

Before 1920: Foundation and first championship wins
Grasshopper was founded on 1 September 1886 by Tom E. Griffith, an English student. Using a 20 Swiss franc donation, the club acquired an English football shirt in blue and white colours (as worn by Blackburn Rovers). The English students were from Manchester Grammar School in Manchester. Arthur J. Finck was one of the students who was part of the group that founded the club. Its first match came in October that year against ETH and ended in a goalless draw. In 1893, Grasshopper became the first Swiss team to play in (what was then) Germany, defeating Strasbourg 1–0.

The first Swiss championships (then called "Serie A") were held in 1897–98 and were won by Grasshopper, as was the first championship played using a league system in 1899–1900. After two more titles in 1901 and 1905, Grasshopper had to withdraw from the Swiss championships in 1909 because they lacked a suitable playing ground. They rejoined in 1916.
The illustrious coach Vittorio Pozzo played briefly
for Grasshoppers, around 1905-06, before he joined the 
Torino F.C..

1920s: Dori Kürschner era
After rejoining the Swiss championship in 1916, GC won their fifth championship in 1921. In 1925 started the era of the Hungarian manager Izidor "Dori" Kürschner, a former member of the coaching staff of the Swiss national team that won the silver medal at the 1924 Olympics. Under Kürschner in the 1920s, Grasshopper won the championship twice (in 1927 and 1928) and also the first two editions of the Swiss Cup in 1925–26 and in 1926–27.

1930s: Beginning of Karl Rappan era
Dori Kürschner stayed with Grasshopper until 1934, winning another championship in 1931 and two more Swiss Cups in 1932 and 1934. Then started the era of Austrian coach Karl Rappan who managed also the Swiss national team for several years during that time. The first title under Rappan came in 1937 and the second one in 1939. They also won the Swiss Cup in 1937 and 1938.

1940s: More titles during World War II
Despite the turmoils of World War II the Swiss championships were held during the 1940s with the Grasshoppers winning in 1942, 1943 and 1945. Until Karl Rappan left the team in 1948, the team also won another five Cups (in 1940, 1941, 1942, 1943 and 1946).

1950s: Last successes for a long time
In 1952, Grasshopper won their 14th Swiss championship title and their 12th Swiss Cup. They managed to win the double again in 1956, but it turned out to be their last silverware for a long time, as they had to wait for 15 years until their next championship and for 27 years until their next Cup win. In 1956–57 Grasshopper participated for the first time in the European Cup which was founded in the previous season. They reached the quarter-finals where they were eliminated by Fiorentina.

1960s: No titles
During the 1960s, Grasshopper won no championships and no Cups. The best result was a second place in 1968, which qualified them to play in the Inter-Cities Fairs Cup, the predecessor of the UEFA Cup. However they had no success at European level either, and they were eliminated in the first round.

1970s: Return to success and UEFA Cup semi-final
In 1971, Grasshopper finally returned to the top of the Swiss league. After the end of the season, GC and FC Basel were tied at the top of the table and thus a play-off match was played in Bern. In front of 51,000 spectators, GC defeated Basel 4–3 after extra time to win their 16th championship. Throughout the decade Grasshopper was among the best Swiss teams. Their next championship win came in 1978.

Thanks to their top finishes in the league, GC was able to play in European competitions almost every year. In 1978–79 they defeated Real Madrid in the second round of the European Cup, but lost the quarter-final against the eventual winner, Nottingham Forest. But their biggest European success to date came in the 1977–78 UEFA Cup where they reached the semi-final against French side Bastia. After a 3–2 win at home, they traveled to Corsica for the second leg but lost 0–1 and were eliminated due to the away goal rule.

1980s: Hat-tricks

The 1980s were a successful decade for Grasshopper. In the years 1982, 1983 and 1984, GC won the championship three times in a row, achieving the "title hat-trick". In all three seasons, Servette from Geneva was their strongest rival, and in 1984 a championship-deciding game had to be staged in Bern because the two teams were equal on points after the regular season. GC won that match 1–0 by a converted penalty kick by Andy Egli in the 104th minute.

Grasshopper were also successful in the Cup competition: after winning in 1983 they also achieved a hat-trick in the Cup, winning in 1988, 1989 and 1990. The last two of those wins were achieved with German manager Ottmar Hitzfeld. A notable success in European competitions came in 1980–81 UEFA Cup when GC reached the quarter-finals, but then were eliminated by French side Sochaux.

1990s: Champions League
In 1995–96 Grasshoppers became the first Swiss team to play in the UEFA Champions League. After defeating Maccabi Tel Aviv to qualify, they played in group D against Ajax, Real Madrid and Ferencváros. They won no matches but achieved two draws, one against Ajax and one against Ferencváros.

In the following year, Grasshoppers qualified a second time for the Champions League, this time after defeating Slavia Prague. In group A with opponents Auxerre, Glasgow Rangers and again AFC Ajax, a more positive result was achieved. After home wins over Rangers and Auxerre and an away win at Ajax, a draw in the last game at home against Ajax would have secured qualification for the quarter finals. However, the game was lost 0–1 and Ajax advanced instead.

2000s: Incorporation
With title wins in 2000–01 and 2002–03, the first decade of the 21st century started well, but since then no further successes were achieved. In 1997, Grasshopper was incorporated and as of May 2005, it is formally organized as Neue Grasshopper Fussball AG. In doing so, Grasshopper became the first Swiss sports club to go public. However, the club entered a period of decline after their last championship in 2003, with two third place finishes in 2005 and 2010 being their best results. In 2012, they narrowly avoided being relegated thanks to Sion's 36-point deduction and Neuchatel Xamax's expulsion from the league in January 2012. Then coach Ciriaco Sforza resigned in April 2012.

For the 2012/13 season, Ulrich Forte took over coaching. On 20 May 2013, Grasshopper ended a ten-year trophy drought with a penalty shoot-out victory over FC Basel in the Swiss Cup final at the Stade de Suisse in Bern. With a second-place finish in the 2012–13 Swiss Super League campaign, Grasshopper qualified for the Champions League for the first time in a decade, entering the competition at the third qualifying round. Following Forte's departure after the 2012/13 season, former German National Team coach Michael Skibbe took over coaching duty. Under Skibbe, the team managed a second place finish in 2013. They also were runners-up in 2014. 

The improving results did not last however and soon declined again. In the following 5 years, they managed to only once finish in the upper half of the table and finally, in 2019, Grasshopper were relegated to the second division for the first time in 68 years. They spend the entire 2018/19 season in the bottom three of the league, ending their season with two abandoned matches due to Grasshopper fan behaviour.

2020s: Relegation and Promotion
The first season in the second league did not go as planned. For one, due to the COVID-19 pandemic, the second half of the season was delayed until late spring 2020. Furthermore, GC failed to even achieve a second place finish, which would have qualified them for a playoff game for promotion, after losing the final game of the season 0-6 against FC Winterthur. During this time, in April 2020, it was revealed that the Hong Kong-based Champion Union HK Holding Limited had acquired 90% of GC shares. The new ownership appointed Sky Sun as the president of the club. In April 2021, Seyi Olofinjana was signed as sporting director. 

For the following season, João Carlos Pereira took over coaching duties at GC. Despite a strong season and spending a majority of the time at first place, the team began to struggle at the close of the season. After a seven point lead on challenger FC Thun had melted away in three games, club leadership took drastic measures by removing Pereira and reinstating Zoltán Kádár (who had been interim coach at the end of the previous season) as interim coach for the final two games of the season. The changes would pay off, as GC secured Challenge League championship and promotion in a 2-1 victory over SC Kriens in the final game. 

For the first season back in the top Swiss league, former FC Lausanne-Sport coach Giorgio Contini was signed as head coach. Despite a decent first half of the season, following the winter break, the team struggled to win points and came dangerously close to the bottom of the league. Improving results in spring 2022 allowed the team to narrowly avoid the relegation playoff, ending the season in eighth place thanks to a better goal difference over FC Luzern. 

During preparation for the new season, sporting director Olofinjana and CEO Shqiprim Berisha were removed from the teams management. President Sun would take over CEO duties in the interim. On 1 July 2022, Grasshopper veteran Bernt Haas was appointed as new sporting director. On 13 February 2023, Sun stepped down from his positions as president and CEO, with vice-president András Gurovits taking up the mantle in the interim. On 19 March 2023, Swiss online news site nau.ch reported that coach Contini had handed in his resignation in mid February, which would see him leaving the club in the summer, following a six month notice period. On the same day, the club confirmed the news and stating their intention of continuing their cooperation for the duration of the season.

Stadium and grounds

Since September 2007, Grasshopper-Club Zürich has played all of its home matches in the Letzigrund stadium which is the regular home ground of FC Zürich. After the completion of the new Stadion Zürich (currently in planning stage), both teams are expected to play there.

From 1929 to 2007, Grasshopper had their own home ground in the Hardturm stadium. Before 1929, home matches were played at various other venues.

Training facilities are located in Niederhasli, where in 2005 the club opened a comprehensive facility including five practice pitches, apartments for youth players and offices.

Rivalries

FC Zürich

FC Zürich was founded ten years after GC in 1896. A year later, the first derby between the two Zurich clubs was held as part of the first Swiss championship, where GC defeated FC Zurich 7–2. As the two teams did not always play in the same league, it would take nearly 70 years until the 100th derby. To date, 251 official derbies have been held, with Grasshopper leading with 121 wins to FC Zurich's 90, leaving 39 draws.

FC Basel
FC Basel has long been a rival to GC, owing largely to the rivalry between the two cities. As a result, games between FC Zurich and FC Basel are also often heated games, often leading to clashes between fans. 

From the late 60s to the early 80s, both GC and Basel had numerous Swiss championship victories. However, in 1988 FC Basel was relegated to the Nationalliga B. The rivalry flared up at the beginning of the 21st century, when FCB's improved performance has made them a mainstay at the top the Swiss league. However, with FCB's rise came GC's downfall and the rivalry has become largely one-sided. The most recent notable meeting between the two teams was the Swiss Cup Final in 2013, where Grasshoppers were able to beat FC Basel in penalties, with a score of 1–1 after extra time.

Honours

League
Swiss Championship
Champions (27): 1897–98, 1899–1900, 1900–01, 1904–05, 1920–21, 1926–27, 1927–28, 1930–31, 1936–37, 1938–39, 1941–42, 1942–43, 1944–45, 1951–52, 1955–56, 1970–71, 1977–78, 1981–82, 1982–83, 1983–84, 1989–90, 1990–91, 1994–95, 1995–96, 1997–98, 2000–01, 2002–03 (record)
Nationalliga B/Challenge League
Winners (2): 1950–51, 2020–21

Cups
Swiss Cup
Winners (19): 1925–26, 1926–27, 1931–32, 1933–34, 1936–37, 1937–38, 1939–40, 1940–41, 1941–42, 1942–43, 1945–46, 1951–52, 1955–56, 1982–83, 1987–88, 1988–89, 1989–90, 1993–94, 2012–13 (record)
Swiss League Cup
Winners: 1973, 1975
Swiss Super Cup
Winners: 1989

European Competitions

 Champions League/European Cup
 Quarter-finalist: 1978–79
 Europa League/UEFA Cup
 Semi-finalist: 1977–78
 European Cup Winners' Cup
 Quarter-finalist: 1989–90

Players

Current squad

Academy players with first-team contracts

Out on loan

Women's team

The women's division was founded in 2009, when GC/Schwerzenbach (originally FFC Schwerzenbach) was absorbed into the club.

Notable former players

Players for the Swiss national football team

  Alfred "Fredy" Bickel
  Thomas Bickel
  Stéphane Chapuisat
  Patrick de Napoli
  Ricardo Cabanas
  Diego Benaglio
  Christoph Spycher
  Christian Gross
  Marcel Koller
  Stephan Lichtsteiner
  Patrick Müller
  Boris Smiljanić
  Roman Bürki
  Pajtim Kasami
  Ciriaco Sforza
  Alain Sutter
  Kubilay Türkyilmaz
  Johann Vogel
  Eldin Jakupović
  Blaise Nkufo
  Yann Sommer
  Hakan Yakin
  Murat Yakin
  Reto Ziegler
  Raimondo Ponte
  Claudio Sulser
  Stéphane Grichting
  Haris Seferovic
  Philippe Senderos
  Bernt Haas

Players with World Cup appearances for their national teams

  Kurt Jara
  Izet Hajrović
  Senad Lulić
  Günter Netzer
  Daniel Davari
  Vittorio Pozzo
  Wynton Rufer
  Efan Ekoku
  Femi Opabunmi
  Franco Navarro
  Tomasz Rząsa
  Viorel Moldovan
  Tosh McKinlay
  Papa Bouba Diop
  Henri Camara
  Ove Grahn
  Mats Gren
  Kim Källström

Coaching staff

Current coaching staff

List of Coaches (since 1925)

Academy Coaches

References

Further reading
 Grasshopper Club Zürich in European football
 Zürich Derby
 Hardturm and Letzigrund

External links

Fan sites
GCZForum – Bulletin Board (Forum) for Fans of GCZ 
GCZone – Fansite of GCZ 
Grassmokers – Oldest unofficial fanclub of GCZ  
Main fan page with organisation for away games 

 
1886 establishments in Switzerland
Association football clubs established in 1886
Football clubs in Switzerland
Multi-sport clubs in Switzerland
Rowing clubs in Switzerland
Sport in Zürich
Swiss floorball teams
Curling clubs